Two ships of the Royal Navy have been named HMS Myosotis :

  an  sloop launched in 1916 and sold in 1923
  a  launched in 1941 and sold in 1946

Royal Navy ship names